Metin Lütfi Baydar (born March 2, 1960) is a Turkish medical scientist. Currently, he is the president of Süleyman Demirel University. He is also chairman and surgeon general of SDU Research Hospital.

Work in Medical Science
Baydar's field of research includes Orthopedics, Sport Medicine and Traumatology. Together with his collaborators, he published research studies specifically in knee surgery and mouthguard use in sports.

Awards and honors
 European Society of Sports Traumatology Knee Surgery and Arthroscopy Scholarship Award, 1994
 European Taekwondo Union Golden Honor Award for his contributions to Taekwando Sport, 2000

References

External links

Academic staff of Süleyman Demirel University
Turkish medical researchers
Living people
1960 births
People from İzmir
Members of the 25th Parliament of Turkey
Members of the 24th Parliament of Turkey
Members of the 26th Parliament of Turkey